KDE Projects are projects maintained by the KDE community, a group of people developing and advocating free software for everyday use, for example KDE Plasma and KDE Frameworks or applications such as Amarok, Krita or Digikam. There are also non-coding projects like designing the Breeze desktop theme and iconset, which is coordinated by KDE's Visual Design Group. Even non-Qt applications like GCompris, which started as a GTK-based application, or web-based projects like WikiToLearn are officially part of KDE.

Overview

As of today there are many KDE projects that are either stand-alone or grouped into larger sub-projects:

 KDE Plasma Workspaces
 KDE Frameworks (formerly KDE-Libs): A collection of libraries that provides frameworks and functionality for developers
 KDE Applications Bundle: Containing core applications like Konqueror, Dolphin, KWrite, and Konsole.

KDE Core projects

 Plasma – UI for multiple workspaces
 KWin – Window manager
 KHTML – HTML rendering engine, forked into WebKit in 2004
 KJS - JavaScript engine
 KIO – Extensible network-transparent file access
 KParts – Lightweight in-process graphical component framework
 XMLGUI – Allows defining UI elements, such as menus and toolbars via XML files
 Phonon – Multimedia framework
 Solid – Device integration framework
 Sonnet – Spell checker
 ThreadWeaver – Library to use multiprocessor systems more effectively

KDE Applications

Major applications developed by KDE include:

 Ark – Archiving tool
 Dragon Player – Media player.
 Dolphin – File manager
 Gwenview – Image viewer
 Kate – Text editor
 Konsole – Terminal emulator
 Kontact – Personal information manager featuring an e-mail client, a news client, a feed aggregator, to-do lists, etc.
 Konqueror – Web browser and File manager
 Kopete – Instant messaging client
 Krita – Raster graphics editor for Digital painting
 Kdenlive – Video editing software

Thematically related groups of applications 

 KDE-Plasma-Addons: Additional Plasma widgets.
 KDE-Network
 KDE-Pim
 KDE-Graphics
 KDE-Multimedia
 KDE-Accessibility: Accessibility applications.
 KDE-Utilities
 KDE-Edu
 Calligra Suite: Integrated office suite
 KDE-Games
 KDE-Toys
 KDE-Artwork: Additional icons, styles, etc.
 KDE-SDK
 KDE-Bindings
 KDEWebdev: Web development tools.
 KDE-Extragear: Extragear is a collection of applications and tools that are not part of the core KDE Applications.
 KDE-Playground: This repository contains new and unstable software. It is a place for applications to mature.

Other projects 
 KDE Connect: An Android application to connect the Plasma desktop to phones for remote control
 KDE neon: a distro featuring the latest KDE software packages on top of an Ubuntu base.
 Wiki2Learn: a wiki-based web framework for people to participate and share knowledge.
 Liquidshell: an alternative to Plasma

Development

Source code

The source code of every KDE project is stored in a source code repository using Git. Stable versions are released to the KDE FTP server in the form of source code with configure scripts, ready to be compiled by operating system vendors and to be integrated with the rest of their systems before distribution. Most vendors use only stable and tested versions of KDE programs or applications, providing it in the form of easily installable, pre-compiled packages.

Implementation 
Most KDE projects are using the Qt framework, which runs on most Unix and Unix-like systems (including Mac OS X), and Microsoft Windows.  CMake serves as the build tool. This allows KDE to support a wider range of platforms, including Windows. GNU gettext is used for translation. Doxygen is used to generate api documentation.

Licensing 
KDE software projects must be released under free licensing terms. In November 1998, the Qt framework was dual-licensed under the free and open-source Q Public License (QPL) and a commercial license for proprietary software developers. The same year, the KDE Free Qt foundation was created which guarantees that Qt would fall under a variant of the very liberal BSD license should Trolltech cease to exist or no free version of Qt be released during 12 months.

Debate continued about compatibility with the GNU General Public License (GPL), hence in September 2000 Trolltech made the Unix version of the Qt libraries available under the GPL in addition to the QPL which eliminated the concerns of the Free Software Foundation. Trolltech continued to require licenses for developing proprietary software with Qt. The core libraries of KDE are collectively licensed under the GNU LGPL but the only way for proprietary software to make use of them was to be developed under the terms of the Qt proprietary license.

Starting with Qt 4.5, Qt was also made available under the LGPL version 2.1, now allowing proprietary applications to legally use the open source Qt version.

See also
 List of KDE applications
 KDE Applications
 KDE Extragear

References

External links

The KDE website
KDE.News, news announcements
KDE community forums, the official forum board
Planet KDE, blog aggregate
KDE wikis
KDE Localization
KDE Store, free extensions and addons for KDE Software

 
1998 software
KDE software
Unix windowing system-related software
Utilities for Linux
Utilities for macOS
Utilities for Windows